Motorway 1 (code: A1, also known as Athens-Thessaloniki-Evzonoi (A.TH.E.) Motorway, and previously as Patras-Athens-Thessaloniki-Evzonoi (P.A.TH.E.) Motorway the 2nd longest motorway in Greece with a length of 550 km. It is the principal north–south road connection in Greece, connecting the country's capital Athens with the regions of Thessaly and Macedonia, as well as the country's second largest city, Thessaloniki. It starts from Neo Faliro in Attica and continues north to reach the Evzonoi border station, on the Greek border with North Macedonia.

Today, the construction, operation and maintenance of Motorway 1 have been largely outsourced to private companies: Aftokinitodromos Aigaiou SA. (Kleidi, Imathia - Raches, Fthiotida), Kentriki Odos SA (Raches, Fthiotida - Skrafia, Fthiotida) and Nea Odos SA (Skarfia, Fthiotida - Metamorfosi, Attica). The section of Kleidi, Imathia-Evzoni since 2014 operates and is maintained by Egnatia Odos SA.

Route 
The motorway passes through Mainland Greece and has largely replaced National Road 1. It begins at Kifissou Avenue, Athens, just north of the Bay of Phaliro, and continues northward to Evzonoi, on the border with the country's northern neighbour, North Macedonia, where it continues as the A1. Before the European routes numbers were changed, the northern part from Efzoni to EO2 was E5N, while today the entire road is part of European route E75. The task of maintaining and charging for parts of the motorway has recently been ceded to private consortia, part of the deal for the construction of the Ionia Odos, the E65, as well as the bypass of Tempe Valley.

The part west of downtown Athens runs over the Cephisus river and Kifissou Avenue.  From north of the boundary of Voiotia - Phthiotis, up to near Velestino, the tollway runs close to the coast of the Aegean Sea. It then continues north of the Tempe Valley and up to the junction of the European route E90. It then shares a 25 km common part with A2 / E90 (on a west–east direction), and then, at the "Axios Interchange", continues north to Evzonoi and the national border with North Macedonia. Its total length is approximately 550 km.

Cities 
Motorway 1 passes near major urban centers in the country:

 Athens
 Thebes
 Chalcis (20 km south - connection via A11)
 Lamia
 Larissa
 Katerini
 Thessaloniki (20 km west - connection via Egnatia Motorway and Thessaloniki's New West Entrance)
 Polykastro

Airports 
The ATHE motorway is connected to the following airports:

 Thessaloniki (Macedonia Airport) (45 km west - connection via Egnatia Motorway, Thessaloniki's new West Entrance and Thessaloniki's Ring Road)
 Nea Anchialos - (10 km west - connection via National Road 30)
 Athens (Eleftherios Venizelos Airport) - (25 km west - connection via Attiki Odos)

Harbours 
The ATH motorway is connected to the following harbours:

 Thessaloniki
 Volos
 Piraeus

Distances in kilometers

History

1950s-1970s 
The old Greek National Road 1, was a historic road, which connected Athens with the Customs of Evzoni, through Dhekelia, Atalanti, Kamena Vourla, Thermopylae, Lamia, Stylida, Almyros, Velestino, Larissa, Valley of Tempi, Katerini, Alexandria, Gefyra and Polykastro. The road followed the route of the streets of antiquity. However, over time, its specifications began to be considered obsolete, as in the rest of Europe, modern highways began were started to be built. Thus, in the mid-1950s, construction work began on a new road, which began in 1959 with the delivery of the Larissa-Katerini section (Later, the Athens-Lamia section in 1962 and the Lamia-Larissa section in 1967) and were completed in 1973, with the delivery of the part Katerini - Thessaloniki - Evzoni. The Polykastro - Evzoni section was the first section with motorway specifications.

1980-today 
Work on the conversion to a motorway began in the mid-1980s, with the construction of the sections Klidi interchange- Gallikos river (delivered in 1988), Bogiati camp - Kryoneri interchange (delivered in 1989) (4.5 km), Inofyta interchange- Schimatari interchange (delivered in 1989) (12.5 km), Ritsona interchange - Thebes interchange (delivered in 1989) (14.8 km). In the early 1990s, work began on the entire length of the sections Athens - Thebes interchange, and Katerini - Klidi.

As early as 1995, National Road 1 had highway specifications in the sections Athens - Yliki, Katerini - Klidi - Thessaloniki and Polykastro - Evzoni.

In 1998, it had six lanes in the Athens (Metamorfosi) -Thebe section and four in the Thebes-Tempi section, with the exception of a few sections in Magnesia, which still had two.

In 2002 the Yliki-Agios Konstantinos section was completed.

In 2004 the first tunnel of the A1 was built, the tunnel of Katerini (tunnels of Alexander the Great and Philip), while in the same year Kifissos Avenue was handed over, which is the part of the road that connects Metamorfosi with Faliro, above the Kifissos river, inside Athens.

In November 2017, with the launch of the tender for the privatization of Egnatia Motorway and the announcement of its terms, it was announced that the upgrade of the Halastra-Polykastro section from an expressway to as motorway was under planning. This was confirmed in September 2018. Construction costs are estimated to exceed €200 million, and the remainder of the axis from Polykastro to Evzoni, which has already been characterized a motorway will be upgraded with more modern features such as safety barriers, new signage and road improvements.

In 2005, it was completed along its entire length, except for the "Horseshoe" of Maliakos and Tempi.

On June 13, 2007, the Aegean Motorway SA was established, which undertook the construction and operation of the motorway in the Raches-Klidi section.

In the same year, the first sections of Maliakos, the Agios Konstantinos Bypass, the Kamenon Vourlon Bypass and the 4.5 km long Agia Paraskevi-Agia Marina section were opened to traffic. In 2008 the Thermopylae-Bralos Bypass section was delivered.

In 2014, the Velestino interchange was completed, which connects ATHE with Volos.

In 2015, the last section of Maliakos Stylida-Raches with the tunnels of Stylida, with the upgraded Lamia interchange and the new bridge of Sperchios (bypass of Lamia) was handed over to traffic.

In 2016, the northern interchange of Katerini was completed, after about 26 years of construction, due to expropriation and financing problems. On April 6, 2017, the section Evangelismos - Skotina (bypass of Tempi and Platamonas), 25 km long, was delivered. In November 2017, with the start of the tender for the privatization of Egnatia Odos and the announcement of its terms, it became known that the HRDH may include in the object of the Concession Agreement the upgrade of the section Halastra - Polykastro from expressway to motorway, which was confirmed in September 2018. The construction cost is estimated to exceed 200 million euros, while the rest of the axis from Polykastro to Evzoni, which already has highway features, will be upgraded with more modern features such as safety railings, new signage and pavement improvement.

Exit list

The exits of the completed sections of the A1 motorway:

Gallery

References

1
Toll roads in Greece
Roads in Central Macedonia
Roads in Thessaly
Roads in Central Greece
Roads in Attica